Sébastien Michaud (born May 7, 1987) started in taekwondo at the age of five, following in his father's and brothers footsteps. Born in Joliette, Quebec, he currently resides in Quebec City, Quebec where he studies software engineering at Université Laval. On April 10, 2012, he was nominated as president of the Association des Étudiants en Génie Logiciel of Université Laval.

Career
Sébastien was part of the three member Canadian Olympic team at the 2008 Summer Olympic Games in Taekwondo along with Ivett Gonda & Karine Sergerie.  He again represented Canada at the 2012 Summer Olympics.

Career Highlights

2007 World Olympic Qualification Tournament: 1st Place
2007 World Taekwondo Championships: Bronze
2007 Canadian Senior National Championships: Gold
2006 Pan American Championships: Gold
2006 Canadian Senior National Championships: Gold

References

External links
Sébastien Michaud - 2007 Taekwondo Canadian Championships clip on Youtube
Sébastien Michaud vs Steven Lopez 2007 World Championships clip on Youtube
Sebastien Michaud 2008 Beijing Olympic Team Profile
2007 Pan American Games Hopefuls for team Canada in Taekwondo

1987 births
Canadian male taekwondo practitioners
French Quebecers
Living people
Olympic taekwondo practitioners of Canada
People from Joliette
Sportspeople from Quebec
Taekwondo practitioners at the 2007 Pan American Games
Taekwondo practitioners at the 2008 Summer Olympics
Taekwondo practitioners at the 2011 Pan American Games
Taekwondo practitioners at the 2012 Summer Olympics
World Taekwondo Championships medalists
Pan American Games competitors for Canada
21st-century Canadian people